Daniel Béland may refer to:

Daniel Béland, Canadian figure skater
Daniel Béland (academic), Canadian public policy scholar